Vitis flexuosa is a species of liana in the grape family.

It has a very large native range in Asian tropical and temperate climate zones.

Distribution
The vine is native to:
 East Asia in Taiwan; the Koreas, Hong Kong; the Chinese provinces of Anhui, Fujian, Gansu, Guangdong, Guangxi, Guizhou, Henan, Hubei, Hunan, Jiangsu, Jiangxi, Shaanxi, Shandong, Sichuan, Yunnan, and Zhejiang; and the Japanese prefectures of Hokkaido, Honshu, Kyushu, Shikoku, and the Ryukyu Islands.
 Southeast Asia in Laos, Thailand, and Vietnam.
 Malesia in the Philippines.
 Indian Subcontinent in the Indian states of Assam, Himachal Pradesh, Jammu and Kashmir, Manipur, Uttar Pradesh and West Bengal; Nepal; northern Pakistan.

Flexuosol A is a stilbene tetramer found in V. flexuosa.

References 

flexuosa
Flora of China
Flora of Japan
Flora of Korea
Flora of tropical Asia
Flora of Taiwan
Flora of the Ryukyu Islands
Plants described in 1794